The Seventh Curse is a 1986 Hong Kong adventure film directed by Lam Ngai Kai based on Ni Kuang's novel series Dr. Yuen Series and stars Chin Siu-ho as Dr. Yuen. The film also stars Chow Yun-fat as Wisely, the protagonist in Ni's Wisely Series who appears as a supporting character in the Dr Yuen Series, while Ni himself serves as the film's narrator and also making a brief appearance as himself.

Plot
Dr. Yuen attempts to rescue a beautiful girl from being sacrificed to the "Worm Tribe" she belongs to. Yuen is damned with seven "Blood Curses" which burst through his leg periodically. He will die when the seventh bursts, but Betsy, the girl he saved, stops the curse with an antidote. The antidote only lasts one year, so on the advice of Wisely he heads back to Thailand to find a permanent cure. Yuen and his allies battle the evil sorcerer of the Worm Tribe, a hideous bloodthirsty baby-like creature, and "Old Ancestor," a skeleton with glowing blue eyes that transforms into a monster.

Alternative versions
This film has at least three different endings for each of its official releases:

In the original theatrical release, after the monster-killing climax, there's another by-the-pool-party scene (same pool as seen in the beginning of the film, but is supposed to be another party) in which Maggie Cheung's character makes up with Dr. Yuen. Then, we cut to the original party-scene that starts off the movie with Dr. Yuen, Wisely, Ni Kuang (the real author of the two pulp-novel series) and a bunch of beautiful girls. As the author finishes telling the movie's story to the girls, one of them asks if he has another adventure story to tell. The author replies, "Well, we have to see what exciting adventures Dr. Yuen and Wisely are going to have." The two main characters come into frame, toast and finish their drink. Freeze-frame, then comes the end-title music and credits.
In the first video release available in Hong Kong during the late 1980s-early 1990s, the last two scenes were completely cut out, so as the very last close-up of Bachu, the native girl. Instead it is replaced with a two-shot of her and her lover, while the end credits roll partly over its freeze-frame, partly over black. Also, in that video release, the native girl's nude scenes were partly censored with the explicit body parts blacked out to make the film more "family-oriented".
In the DVD-edition, the second-to-last scene in the original theatrical release is cut out, whilst the final scene is retained, but with the end credits rolling over. The original dialogues are replaced with the end-title music.

Cast
Chow Yun-fat as Wisely
Chin Siu-ho as Dr. Yuen Chen-hsieh
Dick Wei as  Black Dragon
Maggie Cheung as Tsui Hung
Sibelle Hu as Su
Chui Sau-lai as Betsy
Elvis Tsui as Sorcrer Aquala
Chor Yuen as Chu
Yasuaki Kurata as Captain Ho
Ken Boyle as The Professor
Kara Hui as Inspector Chiang
Ni Kuang as himself/narrator (voice)
Joyce Godenzi as Pool Party Girl (long version)
Wong Jing as Would-be Playboy
Wang Lung-wei as Head Terrorist
Derek Yee as SDU Officer
Chui Sau-lai as Bachu
Nina Li Chi as Champagne Girl (uncredited)

Reception
One reviewer said, "The Seventh Curse is weird and crude, gross and tasteless, silly and shocking, but God is it fun."

See also
 Films and television series adapted from the Wisely Series:
 The Legend of Wisely, a 1987 Hong Kong film starring Samuel Hui as Wisely
 The Cat (1992 film), a 1992 Hong Kong film starring Waise Lee as Wisely
 The New Adventures of Wisely, a 1998 Singaporean television series starring Michael Tao as Wisely
 The Wesley's Mysterious File, a 2002 Hong Kong film starring Andy Lau as Wisely
 The 'W' Files, a 2003 Hong Kong television series starring Gallen Lo as Wisely

References

External links
 
 

1986 films
Hong Kong fantasy adventure films
Hong Kong horror films
Hong Kong action thriller films
Hong Kong martial arts films
1980s adventure films
1980s action thriller films
1986 martial arts films
1986 horror films
Dark fantasy films
Hong Kong supernatural horror films
1980s Cantonese-language films
Golden Harvest films
Films based on Chinese novels
Films set in Thailand
1980s exploitation films
Hong Kong splatter films
1980s Hong Kong films